Volvarina ealesae is a species of sea snail, a marine gastropod mollusk in the family Marginellidae, the margin snails.

Description

Distribution

References

 Powell A.W.B. (1958). Mollusca from the Victoria-Ross quadrants of Antarctica. Reports of the B.A.N.Z. Antarctic Research Expedition 1929-1931, ser. B. 6(9): 167-215.
 Engl, W. (2012). Shells of Antarctica. Hackenheim: Conchbooks. 402 pp

External links

Marginellidae
Gastropods described in 1958